The Birth of a Family is a 2012 South Korean daily drama about an adopted woman who struggles to make a family. It starred Lee So-yeon, Lee Kyu-han and Lee Chae-young. The daily drama aired on SBS on Mondays to Fridays at 19:20 from December 5, 2012 to May 17, 2013 for 115 episodes.

Plot
This story revolves around a girl named Lee Soo-jung (Lee So-yeon)who was adopted and raised by her adoptive parents, Park Geum-ok (Moon Hee-kyung) and her father Lee Kyung-tae (Son Byong-ho) and her brother Lee Soo-ho (Kim Jin-woo). Lee Soo-jung is often in a bad relationship with Ma Ye-ri.

Cast
Lee So-yeon as Lee Soo-jung
Lee Kyu-han as Kang Yoon-jae
Lee Chae-young as Ma Ye-ri
Yoon Seo as young Ye-ri
Moon Hee-kyung as Park Geum-ok
Kim Jin-woo as Lee Soo-ho
Seo Hyun-seok as young Soo-ho 
Son Byong-ho as Lee Kyung-tae
Jung Kyung-soon as Park Young-ok
Na Young-hee as Jang Mi-hee
Im Chae-moo as Ma Jin-chul
Jang Young-nam as Ma Jin-hee
Jung Kyu-soo as Kang Dae-jin
Yang Hee-kyung as Oh Young-ja
Kim Seung-hwan as Choi In-woo
Sung Hoon as Han Ji-hoon
Ryu Hye-rin as Baek Ji-won
Lee Mal-geum as Eun-ah

See also
Seoul Broadcasting System

References

External links
The Birth of a Family official SBS website

Seoul Broadcasting System television dramas
2012 South Korean television series debuts
2013 South Korean television series endings
Korean-language television shows
South Korean romance television series
South Korean melodrama television series
Television series by Hwa&Dam Pictures
Television shows written by Kim Soon-ok